Berlin High School is a public high school located in Berlin, Wisconsin. The school educates about 600 students in grades 9 to 12 in the Berlin Area School District. The school's mascot is the Indians. It replaced the former high school, now listed on the National Register of Historic Places.

Notable alumni
 Bill Butler, former NFL player

References

External links
Berlin High School Official Website

Schools in Green Lake County, Wisconsin
Public high schools in Wisconsin
Educational institutions established in 1918
1918 establishments in Wisconsin